Rezaabad (also Romanized as Reẕāābād; also known as Razābād) is a village in Khenaman Rural District, in the Central District of Rafsanjan County, Kerman Province, Iran. At the 2006 census, its population was 8, in 5 families.

References 

Populated places in Rafsanjan County